Wenceslao Selga Padilla (29 September 1949 – 25 September 2018) was a Filipino Scheut priest who from 2 August 2003 was the Apostolic prefect of the Apostolic Prefecture of Ulaanbaatar, a diocese of the Roman Catholic Church in Mongolia.

Biography
Born in 1949 in Tubao (Philippines), Wenceslao Padilla came from a Catholic family; his father was a catechist. In 1960 he entered the seminary and in 1976 was ordained a priest for Scheut Missionaries. He was a missionary in Taiwan and, for six years, a provincial superior of the Chinese provinces of his Order.

When in 1991 Mongolia and the Holy See established diplomatic relations, he was sent as a missionary to Urga (the old name of Ulanbataar). On 19 April 1992 he was appointed ecclesiastical superior of the mission sui iuris of Urga. He began taking care of street children, the homeless, disabled and old.

When on 8 July 2002, Pope John Paul II established the Apostolic Prefecture of Ulaanbaatar, Father Padilla became its first prefect. On 2 August 2003 he received the episcopal dignity; he received the titular see of Tharros. His episcopal consecration on 29 August 2003 was presided over by Cardinal Crescenzio Sepe, in the Ulanbataar cathedral.

The first Mongolian priest, Joseph Enkhee-Baatar, was ordained by Padilla on 26 August 2016.

He continued in his ministry giving help to homeless and orphans until 2016.

Padilla died on 25 September 2018 in Ulaanbaatar due to a heart attack.

References

External links 
 Father Padilla on Catholic Hierarchy  
 Apostolic Prefecture of Ulanbataar on gcatholic.org 

Filipino Roman Catholic bishops
1949 births
2018 deaths
People from La Union
Filipino expatriates in Mongolia
Roman Catholic missionaries in Taiwan
Roman Catholic missionaries in Mongolia